was the eldest son of Emperor Sushun, the 32nd Emperor of Japan who reigned from 587 to 592. His mother was Ōtomo no Koteko, Sushun's consort.

After the assassination of his father in 592, Hachiko was forced to flee the Soga clan. He made his way north along the western seacoast of Honshū. He came ashore in Dewa Province, where he invested the rest of his life in religious pursuits. 

Prince Hachiko is traditionally venerated at an imperial tomb on the top of Mt. Haguro, in Tsuruoka. The tomb was guarded by Imperial soldiers up until the end of World War II.

Notes

References
 Aston, William George. (1896).  Nihongi: Chronicles of Japan from the Earliest Times to A.D. 697. London: Kegan Paul, Trench, Trubner.  OCLC 448337491
 Earhart, H. Byron. (1970).   A Religious Study of the Mount Haguro Sect of Shugendō: an example of Japanese Mountain Religion. Tokyo: Sophia University.
 Jochi Daigaku. (1989).  Monumenta Nipponica, Vol. 44. Tokyo: Sophia University Press. OCLC 1640509

Japanese princes
542 births
641 deaths
Shugendō practitioners
Sons of emperors